Marsh Barton Priory, otherwise the Priory of St Mary de Marisco or St Mary of the Marsh, was a cell of Augustinian Canons in Marsh Barton, Exeter, Devon, England.

It was founded in the mid-12th century. Although a small house, it owned a fair amount of property in and around Exeter. It was dissolved in 1539. The site seems to have been used mostly as a source of building stone. In the 20th century a "very ordinary and somewhat dilapidated" farmhouse stood there, but was demolished. The site is now a trading estate with no traces of the priory, but carved stone fragments from it occur around Plympton.

See also
 Exeter monastery

References

Further reading
Alexander Jenkins, 1806: The History and Description of the City of Exeter And Its Environs, Ancient and Modern, Civil and Ecclesiastical
Rev. George Oliver, D.D., 1861: The History of the City Of Exeter

Monasteries in Devon
Buildings and structures in Exeter
History of Exeter
Augustinian monasteries in England